The Csorba's mouse-eared bat (Myotis csorbai) is a species of vesper bat. It is found only in Nepal.

References

Mouse-eared bats
Mammals of Nepal
Taxonomy articles created by Polbot
Bats of Asia
Mammals described in 1997
Endemic fauna of Nepal